Tamir Ben Ami is an Israeli footballer who now works as a manager.

Honours
State Cup
2003, 2013
Liga Leumit 
2011–12
Liga Artzit 
2006–07
Toto Cup (Leumit)
2011
Toto Cup (Artzit)
1999–2000, 2005–06, 2006–07

References

1979 births
Living people
Israeli Jews
Israeli footballers
Hapoel Ramat Gan F.C. players
Hapoel Ironi Kiryat Shmona F.C. players
Liga Leumit players
Israeli Premier League players
Hapoel Ramat Gan F.C. managers
Footballers from Ramat Gan
Israeli people of Moroccan-Jewish descent
Association football defenders
Israeli football managers